Hinduism in the Maldives describes the practice of the Hindu religion in the Maldives archipelago. Evidence suggests that Hinduism had a presence in pre-Islamic Maldives. Archaeological remains survive from the 8th or 9th century CE portraying Hindu deities such as Shiva, Lakshmi and the sage Agastya.

Maldivian folklore contains legends about the sage Vashishta, known locally as Oditan Kalēge, a mighty sorcerer. Oditan Kalēge's wife is the beautiful Dōgi Aihā who possesses a fiery temperament and is as powerful a sorceress as her husband. Her name is derived from the Sanskrit word Yogini.

It is not known why the last Buddhist king embraced Islam. The importance of the Arabs as traders in the Indian Ocean by the 12th century may partly explain why this king acted. He adopted the Muslim title and name (in Arabic) of Sultan (discarding the old Divehi title of Maha radun or Ras Kilege) Muhammad al Adil, initiating a series of six Islamic dynasties consisting of 84 sultans and sultanas that lasted until 1932, when the sultanate became elective.

According to Merinid traveller Ibn Batuta, the person responsible for this conversion was Muslim visitor Abu al Barakat from Morocco. However, a more reliable Maldivian tradition says that he was a Persian saint from Tabriz called Yusuf Shamsuddin. He is also referred to as Tabrizugefaanu. His venerated tomb stands on the grounds of the Friday Mosque, or Hukuru miski, in Malé. Built in 1656, this is the oldest mosque in the Maldives.

Demographics

Don Hiyala and Alifulhu

Among Maldivian folklore in which the spirit and sorcery theme are not essential, the most significant is perhaps "Don Hiyalā and Alifulhu". This story about two good-looking lovers is a much changed, Maldivian version of the Rāmāyana. Despite the apparent dissimilarities, the common sequential structure linking the elements of the Maldivian story with the Indian epic (the heroic married couple, the wicked and powerful king, the kidnapping of the beautiful heroine, etc.) Based on Ramayana it is related to Hinduism and the religious landscape of South Asia in general. This is hardly unexpected, for all South and Southeast Asian countries have local Rāmayāna variations and the Maldives is part of South Asian culture.

Status of Hindus in Maldives
Officially no Maldivians are Hindus. The state religion is Sunni Islam and conversion is not allowed. Maldivian customs laws prohibit import of any idol for the purpose of worship.

See also
 Buddhism in the Maldives
 History of the Maldives
 Maldivian folklore
 Music of the Maldives

References

Sources 
Asian Variations in Ramayana. Edited by K.R. Srinivasa Iyengar. Sahitya Akademi. Delhi (1983).
Xavier Romero-Frias, The Maldive Islanders, A Study of the Popular Culture of an Ancient Ocean Kingdom. Barcelona (1999), 
Doń Hiyala āi Alifulu. Abdullah Sādigu, Mulī. Novelty Press. Malé (1996).

External links
Maldives History – original records, articles and translations

Maldives
Maldives
Religion in the Maldives